Air Chief Marshal Sir John Miles Steel,  (11 September 1877 – 2 December 1965) was a senior Royal Air Force commander.

Military career
Steel attended the training ship Britannia from 1892 to 1894. and subsequently served in the Royal Navy. He was promoted to sub-lieutenant in 1897 and served in the Second Boer War as a member of the Naval Brigade. Promotion to commander followed in 1912, and to captain in 1916.

In 1917 Steel was transferred from fleet duties to the Royal Naval Air Service and was appointed Officer Commanding RNAS Eastchurch. In early 1918 Steel was appointed Officer Commanding No. 58 Wing which was based at Eastchurch and in March, at the age of 40, Steel learned to fly. Meanwhile, he became General Officer Commanding No. 8 Group. On 1 April 1918 the Royal Naval Air Service merged with the Royal Flying Corps to form the Royal Air Force. Steel, like other RNAS personnel transferred to the RAF and was promoted to the temporary rank of brigadier general. Promoted to group captain and then air commodore in 1919 he was appointed Deputy Chief of the Air Staff and Director of Operations and Intelligence and, following his promotion to air vice marshal in 1925, he was made Air Officer Commanding the Wessex Bombing Area and then Air Officer Commanding RAF India. He was promoted to air marshal in 1932 and appointed Air Officer Commanding-in-Chief, Air Defence of Great Britain in August 1935. When Bomber Command was created from the Air Defence of Great Britain command in July 1936, Steel became its first Air Officer Commanding-in-Chief in the rank of air chief marshal.

Second World War
In August 1939 Steel came back from retirement to serve as Air Officer Commanding Reserve Command. In April 1940 he was succeeded as AOC by William Welsh and Steel returned to retirement. The following year in April once again returned to active service, this time as the Controller-General of Economy at the Air Ministry. He retired for the last time on 26 September 1945.

References

|-

|-

|-

|-
 

1877 births
1965 deaths
Companions of the Order of St Michael and St George
Knights Commander of the Order of the British Empire
Knights Grand Cross of the Order of the Bath
Royal Navy officers
Royal Air Force generals of World War I
Royal Air Force air marshals
Royal Air Force personnel of World War I
Royal Navy personnel of the Second Boer War
Graduates of Britannia Royal Naval College
People educated at Stubbington House School